Made You Look: A True Story About Fake Art is a 2020 documentary by Barry Avrich about a notable art forgery court case involving Knoedler.

It is one of two documentaries on the subject, alongside 2019's Driven to Abstraction. In 2020, Yahoo reported that Melbar Entertainment Group was working on a feature film adaption of the story.

The film was slated to premiere at the 2020 Hot Docs Canadian International Documentary Festival. Following the festival's cancellation due to the COVID-19 pandemic in Canada, it instead premiered on CBC Television as an episode of the special series Hot Docs at Home.

References

External links

 
 
 

2020 films
2020 documentary films
Documentary films about crime
Canadian documentary films
2020s Canadian films
Films directed by Barry Avrich
Films about art forgery